Charles Whynam "Wyn" Outen (23 May 1880 – 10 November 1964) was a former Australian rules footballer who played with St Kilda in the Victorian Football League (VFL).

Family
The eldest of the six children of Charles George Outen (1856-1929), and Bridget Outen, née Cross, Charles Whynam Outen was born at Williamstown, Victoria on 23 May 1880.
 His brother, William Matthew "Matt" Outen (1883-1930), played for St Kilda in the VFL and Williamstown in the VFA; Matt played with Wyn in the Willamstown First XVIII team that won the 1907 VFA premiership.
 His brother, John Edward "Jack" Outen (1890-1963), played in one First XVIII game for Williamstown (alongside his brother Matt) in 1909.
 His brother, Percy Ernest Hatherley Outen (1898-1986), played in 5 First XVIII games for Williamstown in the VFA in 1928.<ref>P.E. Outen in The VFA Project'.</ref>
 His brother, Albert Henry "Alby" Outen (1902-1972), played for Footscray in both the VFA and the VFL. 
 His son, Reginald Whynam Outen (1913-1999),Back in the Four, The Williamstown Chronicle, (Saturday, 12 August 1939), p.6. was an emergency in Williamstown's 1939 premiership team, after earlier playing with Collingwood and Melbourne Seconds.
 His nephew, Albert Keith "Alby" Outen (1936-2010), Albert's son, played 2 games with Footscray in 1954 before transferring to Williamstown and playing in their 1955 and 1956 premiership teams.

He married Priscilla Louise Dainton (1884-1968) in 1913.

Football
Williamstown (VFA)
Outen originally played with Williamstown in the VFA from 1899-1901.

St Kilda (VFL)
He was cleared from Williamstown to St Kilda on 17 April 1903. 

In early 1906 he was given 12 month leave of absence from his employment at the Newport Railway Workshops "to visit Western Australia"; and, in June 1906 it was reported that he was "now playing football in West Australia".

By April 1907 he had returned to the Newport Workshops, and was captain of a Workshops team that played against Williamstown in a pre-season practice match. He returned to play for the St Kilda First XVIII in the first match of the 1907 season, against Carlton, at Princes Park, on 27 April 1907.

Williamstown (VFA)
He was cleared from St KIlda to Williamstown in July 1907.
He returned there after his time with the Saints in 1907 to vice-captain and star in the centre in 'Town's 18-point premiership victory that year over West Melbourne, the first flag in Williamstown's history. He captained the team in 1908 & 1909 and finished up with 99 games and 19 goals up until the end of 1909.

Cricket
He was an excellent cricketer, playing for the Williamstown Cricket Club for a number of years. He represented the "Locomotive Department of Victoria" in an Intercolonial match against the "Locomotive Department of South Australia" in December 1898.

Death
He died on 10 November 1964.

 Notes 

References
 
 The Williamstown Football Team, The Leader, (Saturday, 20 June 1908, p.27.

 External links 

 
 
 Wyn Outen at The VFA Project.
 Wyn Outen at Boyles Football Photos''.

1880 births
1964 deaths
Australian rules footballers from Melbourne
Australian Rules footballers: place kick exponents
St Kilda Football Club players
Williamstown Football Club players
People from Williamstown, Victoria